Katni South railway station  (station code: KTES) is a railway station in Katni and part of the West Central Railway. It is on the Allahabad–Jabalpur section and connects to Katni–Bilaspur line and Katni–Billibari link.

See also

References

Jabalpur railway division
Railway stations in Katni district